Shaikh Ahmad Khatib al-Minangkabawi (1860 – 1916) was a Minangkabau Islamic teacher. He was born in Koto Tuo, Dutch East Indies on 6 Dzulhijjah 1276 H (1860 M) and died in Mecca, Ottoman Empire on 8 Jumadil Awal 1334 H (1916 M). He served as the head (imam) of the Shafi'i school of law at the mosque of Mecca (Masjid al-Haram). Many Indonesian Islamic reformist leaders learned from him, including Ahmad Dahlan, as founder Muhammadiyah and Hasyim Asyari, as founder Nahdlatul Ulama.

Although Ahmad Khatib was an orthodox Sunni Muslim, he still hoped to reconcile the matrilineal system in Minangkabau with the laws of inheritance prescribed in the Quran. Through his Minangkabau students who studied in Mecca and well as those he taught in Indonesia, he encouraged a modified Minangkabau culture based on al-Quran and the Sunnah.

His eldest son Abdulkareem owned a book store in Makkah.
His son Abdulmalik Alkhatib was an ambassador of the Ashraf to Egypt.
His son, Sheikh Abdulhameed Alkhateeb, was the first Saudi Arabian ambassador to the Islamic Republic of Pakistan. And his grand son, Fouad Abdulhameed Alkhateeb, was a Saudi Arabian ambassador, humanitarian, author, and businessman. In his capacity as a diplomat, he represented his homeland in Pakistan, Iraq, the United States of America, the Federal Republic of Nigeria, the Republic of Turkey, the People's Republic of Bangladesh, Nepal, and finally as Saudi ambassador to Malaysia.

Biography
Khatib was born on 26 June 1860 in Koto Tuo, Ampek Angkek, Agam Division, Sumatra's West Coast, Dutch East Indies. His parents were Abdullatief Khatib and Limbak Urai. In 1870 he attended Dutch's school then continued his study to Kweekschool in Bukittinggi. Later, he moved to the Ottoman Empire to receive nominal Islamic education under the guidance of the Islamic jurists of the empire, and settled in Mecca for the rest of his life.

Books
Arabic language :
 Hasyiyah An Nafahat ‘ala Syarhil Waraqat lil Mahalli
 Al Jawahirun Naqiyyah fil A’malil Jaibiyyah
 Ad Da’il Masmu’ ‘ala Man Yuwarritsul Ikhwah wa Auladil Akhwan Ma’a Wujudil Ushul wal Furu’
 Raudhatul Hussab
 Mu’inul Jaiz fi Tahqiq Ma’nal Jaiz
 As Suyuf wal Khanajir ‘ala Riqab Man Yad’u lil Kafir
 Al Qaulul Mufid ‘ala Mathla’is Sa’id
 An Natijah Al Mardhiyyah fi Tahqiqis Sanah Asy Syamsiyyah wal Qamariyyah
 Ad Durratul Bahiyyah fi Kaifiyah Zakati Azd Dzurratil Habasyiyyah
 Fathul Khabir fi Basmalatit Tafsir
 Al ‘Umad fi Man’il Qashr fi Masafah Jiddah
 Kasyfur Ran fi Hukmi Wadh’il Yad Ma’a Tathawuliz Zaman
 Hallul ‘Uqdah fi Tashhihil ‘Umdah
 Izhhar Zaghalil Kadzibin fi Tasyabbuhihim bish Shadiqin
 Kasyful ‘Ain fi Istiqlal Kulli Man Qawal Jabhah wal ‘Ain
 As Saifu Al Battar fi Mahq Kalimati Ba’dhil Aghrar
 Al Mawa’izh Al Hasanah Liman Yarghab minal ‘Amal Ahsanah
 Raf’ul Ilbas ‘an Hukmil Anwat Al Muta’amil Biha Bainan Nas
 Iqna’un Nufus bi Ilhaqil Anwat bi ‘Amalatil Fulus
 Tanbihul Ghafil bi Suluk Thariqatil Awail fima Yata’allaq bi Thariqah An Naqsyabandiyyah
 Al Qaulul Mushaddaq bi Ilhaqil Walad bil Muthlaq
 Tanbihul Anam fir Radd ‘ala Risalah Kaffil ‘Awwam, 
 Hasyiyah Fathul Jawwad 
 Fatawa Al Khathib ‘ala Ma Warada ‘Alaih minal Asilah
 Al Qaulul Hashif fi Tarjamah Ahmad Khathib bin ‘Abdil Lathif

Indonesian language :
 Mu’allimul Hussab fi ‘Ilmil Hisab
 Ar Riyadh Al Wardiyyah fi Ushulit Tauhid wa Al Fiqh Asy Syafi’i
 Al Manhajul Masyru’ fil Mawarits
 Dhaus Siraj Pada Menyatakan Cerita Isra’ dan Mi’raj
 Shulhul Jama’attain fi Jawaz Ta’addudil Jumu’attain
 Al Jawahir Al Faridah fil Ajwibah Al Mufidah
 Fathul Mubin Liman Salaka Thariqil Washilin
 Al Aqwal Al Wadhihat fi Hukm Man ‘Alaih Qadhaish Shalawat
 Husnud Difa’ fin Nahy ‘anil Ibtida’
 Ash Sharim Al Mufri li Wasawis Kulli Kadzib Muftari
 Maslakur Raghibin fi Thariqah Sayyidil Mursalin
 Izhhar Zughalil Kadzibin
 Al Ayat Al Bayyinat fi Raf’il Khurafat
 Al Jawi fin Nahw
 Sulamun Nahw
 Al Khuthathul Mardhiyyah fi Hukm Talaffuzh bin Niyyah
 Asy Syumus Al Lami’ah fir Rad ‘ala Ahlil Maratib As Sab’ah
 Sallul Hussam li Qath’i Thuruf Tanbihil Anam
 Al Bahjah fil A’malil Jaibiyyah
 Irsyadul Hayara fi Izalah Syubahin Nashara
 Fatawa Al Khathib

See also
Islam in Indonesia
List of Minangkabaus
Overseas Minangkabau

References

Footnotes

Bibliography
Ricklefs, M.C. A History of Modern Indonesia Since c. 1300, 2nd ed. Stanford: Stanford University Press, 1994.

1860 births
1916 deaths
Indonesian Islamic religious leaders
Minangkabau people
Indonesian imams